Provincial Institute of Technology and Art (PITA) was the predecessor institution of both the Alberta University of the Arts and Southern Alberta Institute of Technology.

In 1933, Marion Nicoll became its first permanent woman instructor. She taught there from 1933 to 1965, leading the School of Crafts and achieving the status of being one of the most nationally recognized artists on staff. During her time there, the School of Painting only had male instructors, including James Stanford Perrott (who had been Nicoll's student), Henry G. Glyde, Walter Phillips, and Illingworth Kerr.

References 

Universities and colleges in Calgary
Southern Alberta Institute of Technology